Pyrausta sikkima is a moth in the family Crambidae. It was described by Frederic Moore in 1888. It is found in the Himalayas and on the Andamans.

References

Moths described in 1888
sikkima
Moths of Asia